WWLL (105.7 FM) is a radio station known as "105.7 Lite FM" which broadcasts from Sebring, in Highlands County, Florida, United States. The station's format is adult contemporary.

External links
 WWLL official website
 

WLL
Mainstream adult contemporary radio stations in the United States